Sergio Cammariere (born 15 November 1960 in Crotone, Italy) is an Italian jazz singer-songwriter. He has released ten albums.

Career
After a long career as a niche musician distinguished by his collaboration with the poet and singer-songwriter Roberto Kunstler, in 2003 he appeared at the Sanremo Festival performing the song Tutto quello che un uomo. He came in third place in this contest and won the Mia Martini Critics Award.

His music video  "Sorella Mia" won a prize at the Fandango "Videoclipped The Radio Stars" festival.
His music can be classified as jazz and Cammariere performs on the piano and sings.

Cammariere is a distant cousin of Italian singer-songwriter Rino Gaetano.

Discography

Singles
 1998 – Tempo perduto
 2003 – Tutto quello che un uomo

Albums

 1993 – Kunstler-Cammariere & Stress Band I ricordi e le persone
 2002 – Dalla pace del mare lontano
 2003 – Dalla pace del mare lontano (Second version, including the track Tutto quello che un uomo – Sanremo 2003)
 2004 – Sul sentiero
 2006 – Il pane, il vino e la visione
 2009 – Carovane
 2012 – Sergio Cammariere
 2014 – Mano nella mano
 2016 – Io
 2017 – Piano
 2019 – La fine di tutti i guai

Soundtracks
 1992 Quando eravamo repressi
 1994 Teste Rasate
 1996 USD – Uomini senza donne
 2007 L'Abbuffata
 2010 Comiche vagabonde (Tre comiche di Charlie Chaplin)
 2010 – Ritratto di mio padre
 2011 Tiberio Mitri – il campione e la miss
 2013 Maldamore
 2018 Prima che il gallo canti
 2018 Apri le labbra
 2019 Twelve minutes of rain

Compilations
 2008 – Cantautore piccolino
 2017 – L'artista, la vita, la storia

References

External links
Official website

Sergio Cammariere @ MySpace

1960 births
Living people
People from Crotone
Italian jazz singers
Italian songwriters
Male songwriters
Male jazz musicians